The Long Walk is a dystopian horror novel by American writer Stephen King, published  in 1979, under the pseudonym Richard Bachman. It was collected in 1985 in the hardcover omnibus The Bachman Books, and has seen several reprints since, as both paperback and hardback. In 2023, Centipede Press released the first stand-alone hardcover edition, which was fully illustrated by Jim & Ruth Keegan.

Set in a future dystopian America, ruled by a totalitarian and militaristic dictator, the plot revolves around the contestants of a grueling annual walking contest. In 2000, the American Library Association listed The Long Walk as one of the 100 best books for teenage readers published between 1966 and 2000.

While not the first of King's novels to be published, The Long Walk was the first novel he wrote, having begun it in 1966–67 during his freshman year at the University of Maine some eight years before his first published novel Carrie was released in 1974.

Plot
In a dystopian America, a major source of entertainment is the Long Walk, in which one hundred teenage boys walk without rest along U.S. Route 1. The last boy left walking receives a large sum of money and a "Prize" of his choice.

Ray Garraty from Androscoggin County, Maine arrives at the start of the Walk on the Canada-Maine border, where he meets several other Walkers such as the sardonic McVries, the friendly Baker, the cocky Olson and the enigmatic Stebbins. The Major, the leader of the secret police force known as the Squads, starts the Walk. Throughout the first day, Garraty befriends Baker, Olson, and several other Walkers such as Abraham and Pearson, growing particularly close to McVries and becoming particularly intrigued by Stebbins. A Walker named Barkovitch reveals to a reporter that he's in the Long Walk to 'dance on the graves' of other participants, and later provokes another Walker into attacking him, resulting in the Walker's death and Barkovitch being ostracized.

Garraty succeeds in surviving the night. Scramm, the odds-on favorite in Vegas, tells Garraty that he has a pregnant wife and so will have sufficient motivation to keep going. Garraty decides that his motivation will be surviving until Freeport as this will allow him to see his girlfriend Jan in the crowd. The Walkers begin to resent the Major, and McVries stops walking in an attempt to fight the soldiers, but is saved by Garraty. In return, McVries saves Garraty's life after Garraty experiences hysterics when the spectators increase in number. This camaraderie infuriates Olson, who is now severely fatigued and wants Garraty to die. Garraty reveals to the others that his father was Squaded, and a fight almost breaks out between McVries and another Walker, Collie Parker, when Parker claims that only 'damn fools' are Squaded.

Stebbins tells Garraty both that he believes he's going to win, and that the Walkers are all participating because they want to die. McVries and Baker both seem to be examples of this, due to McVries seeking pain and Baker's fascination with death; McVries also tells Garraty that he will sit down when he can't walk any further. Stebbins also  advises Garraty to watch Olson, who keeps walking despite being unresponsive. After Garraty brings Olson out of this state, Olson attacks the soldiers and is killed slowly and brutally.

Scramm catches pneumonia and becomes unable to finish the Walk, and the other Walkers agree that the winner should provide financial security for Scramm's wife. Garraty asks Barkovitch to join the agreement, and Barkovitch agrees as he has become lonely and manic in his isolation from the others. Garraty also asks Stebbins, who tells Garraty that there was nothing special about Olson and that he was lying; Garraty, however, believes that Stebbins came to a realization that scared him. Scramm thanks the others and is killed in an act of defiance against the soldiers.

After developing a charley horse, Garraty is given three warnings and has to walk for an hour to lose one. To distract himself, he tells McVries about how he felt a compulsion to join the Walk and that his mother was blinded by the thought of financial security. McVries reveals that he joined the Walk against the wishes of his family, and Abraham tells Garraty that he didn't withdraw after being accepted due to the amusement it provided his town.

Garraty begins to suffer from doubts about his sexuality and masculinity due to suppressed memories re-emerging, especially after McVries hints that he is sexually attracted to Garraty. This causes Garraty to lash out at a deteriorating Barkovitch, and Barkovitch dies by suicide when the rest of the Walkers begin taunting him. Garraty wakes the next morning to find that many Walkers (including Pearson) have died overnight, as Barkovitch predicted.

When the Walkers arrive in Freeport, Garraty attempts to die in Jan's arms but is saved by McVries. As a response, Abraham convinces the Walkers to make a promise to stop helping each other, which Garraty does reluctantly. This has disastrous consequences: Parker starts a revolution against the soldiers but is killed when nobody joins in; Abraham removes his shirt and catches pneumonia overnight because nobody can offer him a replacement, resulting in his death; Baker falls over and gains a severe nosebleed, and is given three warnings as nobody can help him up.

On the morning of the fifth day, Stebbins reveals to Garraty and McVries that he is the Major's son, and that his Prize would be acceptance into the Major's household. However, Stebbins has become aware that the Major is using him as a 'rabbit' to cause the Walk to last longer, which has worked, as seven Walkers make it into Massachusetts. Baker, now somewhat delirious and described as a 'raw-blood machine', tells Garraty that he can't walk any further and thanks Garraty for being his friend. Garraty unsuccessfully tries to talk him out of suicide.

With Baker dead, the only remaining Walkers are Garraty, Stebbins and McVries. As Garraty tells him a fairy tale, McVries falls asleep and begins walking at the crowd, and Garraty breaks his promise and saves him; however, McVries chooses to sit down and die peacefully. A distraught Garraty is beckoned by a dark figure further ahead, and decides that he will give up because Stebbins cannot be beaten. When he tries to tell Stebbins, Stebbins clutches at him in horror and falls over dead. His corpse is shot when the Major arrives.

This leaves Garraty the uncomprehending winner. He ignores the Major and approaches the dark figure (whom he believes to be another Walker), declaring that there is 'still so far to walk'.

Characters
 Raymond Davis 'Ray' Garraty (#47)
 The novel's main character and narrator, a sixteen-year-old boy from Pownal, Maine (for which he is called a 'hick'). He is described as tall and well built with a 'heavy shock' of 'straw-thatch' hair and a faded army fatigue jacket. Garraty is bitter, naive and thoughtful, which makes him a good confidant for the other Walkers, and felt a compulsion to join the Walk that he struggles to understand. Although he has done farmwork, he is not an experienced athlete. His hobbies include dancing, reading, knitting and constellations; conversely, he dislikes beer and cities.
 Peter 'Pete' McVries (#61)
 Garraty's closest companion, a sixteen-year-old boy from Passaic, New Jersey. He is described as 'awesomely fit' with black hair, a knapsack and a white scar across his cheek, which he received from his ex-girlfriend. McVries is sardonic and has a masochistic streak, often goading others into pushing him away even during the pains of the Walk. He saves Garraty multiple times in the game, also giving him advice. He carries a strong hatred towards Barkovitch, stating his only desire is to outlast him. 
 Stebbins (#88)
 A loner who walks at the rear of the group, a seventeen-year-old boy and the illegitimate son of the Major. He is described as a 'lean Buddha' with pale blue eyes and a 'sickly halo' of blond hair, and wears an old green sweater, a blue chambray shirt, purple pants and tennis shoes (which he later swaps for moccasins). Stebbins is calm, playful and mocking, and often talks to Garraty in riddles. He is convinced that the Walk is rigged, and is scared at the prospect of it being a straight game.
 Arthur 'Art' Baker (#3)
 Another boy who is close with Garraty and McVries. He is a boy from a large, lower-class family in Louisiana (for which he is called a 'cracker'). He is described as appearing 'young and beautiful' and 'almost ethereal', as moving with 'deceptive leisure', and as wearing a red-striped shirt. Baker is sweet and sincere, but is a con artist and a former night rider, and he has a fascination with his own death.
 Henry 'Hank' Olson (#70)
 One of Garraty's earliest companions, a boy of unknown background. He is described as an experienced smoker wearing his foodbelt slung low 'like a gunslinger'. Olson is cocky and arrogant and humorous ('raring to rip'), but quickly becomes withdrawn and unresponsive, with Garraty believing that he has become a 'human Flying Dutchman'.
 Gary Barkovitch (#5)
 A boy from Washington DC. He is described as small and olive-skinned with a sharp nose and hooded eyes, and he sometimes wears a vinyl yellow rainhat; Garraty considers him to look like a 'destructive child's teddy bear'. Barkovitch is intense and adheres to a mysterious 'Plan', and threatens to 'dance on the graves' of the other Walkers, but becomes paranoid and insane when they ostracize him. He and McVries have a heated hatred towards each other throughout the walk. 
 Abraham 'Abe' (#2)
 One of Garraty's companions, a seventeen-year-old boy called a 'rube'. He is described as disjointed and shambling, with reddish hair, Oxford shoes and a jacket tied around his waist. Abraham is droll and somber and short-tempered, particularly when jibes are made at his intelligence, and entered the Walk partially as a joke.
 Collie Parker (#71-79)
 A boy from Joliet, Illinois. He is described as a big-muscled blond with a polo shirt and an insolent look; Garraty further describes him as a 'leather jacket hero' and a 'Saturday night tough guy'. Parker despises Maine and uses excessive profanity, and often attempts to flirt with the spectators despite considering them to be 'pigs'.
 Pearson (#73-81)
 One of Garraty's companions. He is described as a tall boy with glasses and pants that are too big for him. Pearson is morose and enjoys poetry, game theory and chess, and views the Walk as a competition that can be solved logically. For luck, Pearson has ninety-nine pennies in his pocket, and moves one to his other pocket whenever someone dies.
 Scramm (#85)
 The predicted winner of the current Long Walk, a boy from Arizona with a pregnant wife. He is described as a shaggy young man with a crew cut, few remaining teeth, and a 'moose-like' physique. Although dim-witted, Scramm is friendly and possesses a 'simple dignity'. He has dropped out of school and works in a bedsheet factory.

Adaptations
In 1988, George A. Romero was approached to direct the film adaptation, but it never happened.

By 2007, Frank Darabont had secured the rights to the film adaptation of the novel. He said that he would "get to it one day". He planned to make it low-budget, "weird, existential, and very self contained".

Kirby Heyborne narrated an audiobook adaptation of the novel in 2010 for Blackstone Audio.

In April 2018, it was announced that New Line Cinema would develop a film adaptation of the novel. Darabont's rights to the film had lapsed, and filmmaker James Vanderbilt stepped in to write and produce the film with Bradley Fischer and William Sherak of the Mythology Entertainment production company. On May 21, 2019, New Line announced that André Øvredal would direct the adaptation.

See also
 Death march
 Delta Force selection process
 Battle Royale (novel)

References

External links
 The Long Walk at Stephen King's official site

1979 science fiction novels
1979 American novels
American speculative fiction novels
Psychological novels
Fiction about death games
Dystopian novels
Novels set in Maine
Novels by Richard Bachman
Novels about World War II alternate histories
Signet Books books